The Hong Kong local elections are elections in Hong Kong for the members of District Councils (known as District Boards before 2000). First held in 1982, the elections are held at 4-year intervals for returning a total of 452 elected members as at 2019. The last election was held on 24 November 2019.

Background 
The Green Paper: A Pattern of District Administration in Hong Kong was published on 6 June 1980 for public consultations on reforming local administration in Hong Kong. The Green Paper recommended that: District Boards (區議會) be established in each district with some members of District Boards be returned by elections.

Upon the conclusion of public consultations, the White Paper: District Administration in Hong Kong in Hong Kong was published in January 1981 affirming the Government's commitment to establish District Boards in each district by March 1982. District Boards in New Territories were to be established by reconstituting existing District Consultation Committees. The Government subsequently enacted the District Board Ordinance (Cap. 366) to provide for the formation of District Boards:
 to be composed of elected members, appointed or elected members of the Urban Council or chairmen of Rural Committees, appointed unofficial members and main official members of corresponding District Management Committees;
 to be formed by around 25-30 members, with an unofficial majority;
 to be initially chaired by officials, but chairmen to be elected among members as soon as possible; and
 with 1-2 members per constituency, elected through first-past-the-post voting or single non-transferable vote.

The first elections for District Boards on Hong Kong Island and in Kowloon were held on 4 March 1982, while elections for District Boards in the New Territories were held on 23 September 1982.

Electoral System 
The elections are conducted by simple plurality since 1982, with each constituency having an average population of around 17,000 people. Changes to the composition and electoral system of elected District Council members are outlined as follows:

Electoral Results

Division of Districts and Constituencies
A total of 18 District Councils were established, each with 11 to 37 elected members depending on the respective population. Historically, there were19 District Councils but Mong Kok District Council was merged with the Yau Tsim District Council to form the Yau Tsim Mong District Council, named after a neologism that incorporates words from three major areas of the district into its name.

Existing District Councils are listed as follows:

Hong Kong Island
 Central & Western District 
 Eastern District 
 Southern District 
 Wan Chai District

Kowloon (including New Kowloon)
 Kowloon City District 
 Kwun Tong District 
 Sham Shui Po District 
 Wong Tai Sin District 
 Yau Tsim Mong District

New Territories (excluding New Kowloon)
 Islands District 
 Kwai Tsing District 
 North District 
 Sai Kung District 
 Sha Tin District 
 Tai Po District 
 Tsuen Wan District 
 Tuen Mun District 
 Yuen Long District

Nominations
Lists for parties and for individuals may be nominated during a two-week nomination period ending five weeks before polling day.

Candidacy requirement
Candidates have to fulfill the following requirements:
 has reached 21 years of age;
 is a permanent resident of Hong Kong;
 is registered and eligible for registration as an elector for geographical constituencies;
 has ordinary resided in Hong Kong for the 3 years immediately preceding the nomination; and
 does not hold office as the chairman of a Rural Committee

References

External links
 Website for the 2007 District Council elections
Factors affecting participation of Hong Kong people in District Council

 
Local